North Lakes State College is a coeducational independent public school based in North Lakes, Queensland, a suburb in the Moreton Bay Region, north of the Brisbane metropolitan area. The school has a total enrolment of more than 2900 students from Prep to Year 12 each year, with an official count of 2997 students in 2017. The college consists of two campuses, with the main campus situated on Joyner Circuit, while a second campus, known as the Urban Learning Centre, is situated on North Lakes Drive and accommodates students in the Senior Secondary phase.

The college's position of Executive Principal is held by Katrina Larsen.

History

North Lakes State College was established in 2002 as a P-3 college with an enrolment of approximately 150 students, 75 of which were in the Pre-school years and 75 of which were enrolled in Years 1-3. In 2003, Years 4, 5 and 6 were introduced to the college, along with the facilities known as the Villa Precinct. In 2004, Year 7 was introduced and the facilities known as the Lodge Precinct opened. This year also saw a large development across the site in preparation for the introduction of the secondary component of Years 8 and 9 in 2005. The year 2006 saw the introduction of Year 10 and the construction of the Urban Learning Centre, with the Senior Secondary years of Year 11 introduced in 2007 and Year 12 introduced in 2008.

References

External links
 
 Queensland School Enrolment Plans

Schools in South East Queensland
Educational institutions established in 2002
2002 establishments in Australia
North Lakes, Queensland
Buildings and structures in Moreton Bay Region